David E. Armbruster (February 9, 1917 – October 16, 1993) was a former member of the Ohio House of Representatives and the founder of Armbruster florists in Middletown, Ohio.

References

1917 births
Members of the Ohio House of Representatives
1993 deaths
20th-century American politicians
People from Middletown, Ohio